Anya Taylor-Joy (born 16 April 1996) is an Argentinian British-American actress and model, who has received several accolades, including a Critics' Choice Television Award, a Golden Globe Award and a Screen Actors Guild Award.

Taylor-Joy made her debut in the fantasy series Atlantis (2015), and had her breakthrough for starring as Thomasin in the horror film The Witch (2015), which earned her the Empire Award for Best Newcomer and a nomination for the Saturn Award for Best Performance by a Younger Actor. She starred in the psychological horror films Split (2016) and Glass (2019), and Lily Reynolds in the black comedy Thoroughbreds (2017). In 2017, she earned a nomination for the BAFTA Rising Star Award, and won the Trophée Chopard at the Cannes Film Festival.

Taylor-Joy garnered praise for her roles as Emma Woodhouse in the comedy-drama film Emma. (2020) and Beth Harmon in the coming-of-age period drama miniseries The Queen's Gambit (2020). For Emma., she earned nominations for the Golden Globe Award for Best Actress – Motion Picture Comedy or Musical and the Satellite Award for Best Actress – Motion Picture. For The Queen's Gambit, she won the Golden Globe Award for Best Actress – Miniseries or Television Film, the Critics' Choice Television Award for Best Actress in a Movie/Miniseries and the Screen Actors Guild Award for Outstanding Actress in a Television Movie or Miniseries.

Awards and nominations

Major associations

Miscellaneous awards

References

Lists of awards received by American actor
Lists of awards received by British actor